Edgbaston is an affluent suburban area of central Birmingham, England, historically in Warwickshire, and curved around the southwest of the city centre. 

In the 19th century, the area was under the control of the Gough-Calthorpe family and the Gillott family, who refused to allow factories or warehouses to be built in Edgbaston, making it attractive for the wealthier residents of the city. It then came to be known as "where the trees begin". One of these private houses is grade one listed and open to the public. 

The majority of Edgbaston that falls under the  B15 postcode is part of the Calthorpe Estate. The estate is an active conservation area, and it is here that the areas most prized properties are situated. The exclusivity of Edgbaston is down to its array of multi-million-pound listed Georgian and Victorian villas, making it one of the most expensive postcodes outside of London. 

Edgbaston boasts facilities such as Edgbaston Cricket Ground, a Test match venue, the University of Birmingham, established in this location in 1900, the Birmingham Botanical Gardens, as well as eight out of the nine independent schools within the city, Elmhurst Ballet School, Edgbaston Golf Club, a private members club, as well as the Priory Club, which offers sporting facilities. The area also has the Edgbaston Archery and Lawn Tennis Society, the oldest lawn tennis club in the world that is still in use. The first game of lawn tennis was played in Edgbaston, in a garden of a house known as "Fairlight".

The area is also home to a Michelin star restaurant, Simpsons, as well as pubs such as The Highfield, The Physician and the boutique hotel, The Edgbaston.

The parliamentary constituency of Edgbaston includes the smaller Edgbaston ward and the wards of North Edgbaston, Bartley Green, Harborne and Quinton. Edgbaston is also a local government district, managed by its own district committee.

Etymology
Edgbaston means "village of a man called Ecgbald", from the Old English personal name + tun "farm". The personal name Ecgbald means "bold sword" (literally "bold edge"). The name was recorded as a village known as Celboldistane in the Hundred of Coleshill in the 1086 Domesday Book until at least 1139, wrongly suggesting that Old English stān "stone, rock" is the final element of the name.

Demography

In 1801, Edgbaston had a population of around 1,000 people. By 1841, this had increased to 16,500 as a result of wealthy manufacturers moving to the area. By 1850, 29 roads had been laid out and uninterrupted growth continued.

The United Kingdom Census 2001 found that 20,749 people were living in the Birmingham City Council ward of Edgbaston, in 8,666 households. This produced an average of 2.4 people per household, slightly below the citywide average of 2.5. The ward, which has an area of 871.6ha, had a population density of 23.8 people per hectare. Like the city of Birmingham, Edgbaston had a slightly higher proportion of females, at 50.1%, to males. 27.1% of the population was in the 25–44 age bracket and 15.1% were aged between 45 and 59. At 14.8%, Edgbaston had a lower proportion of people of a pensionable age than the rest of Birmingham (16.7%). It also had a lower proportion of people of working age at 73.8%, although it was above the national percentage of 61.5%.

Edgbaston has a slightly above average percentage for ethnic minorities with ethnic minorities representing 31.8% of the population as opposed to 29.6% for Birmingham. The largest ethnic minority group was the British Asian group at 16.1%. 25.6% of people were born outside of the United Kingdom, above the Birmingham figure of 16.5%. Christianity was the predominant religion, with 52.5% of the population stating that they were Christians, compared with 59.1% for Birmingham. 8.0% stated that they were Muslims, below the Birmingham figure of 14.3%. Edgbaston was home to a significant Orthodox Jewish community. 19.1% of the Edgbaston population stated that they had no religion.

46.4% of households were owner-occupied, below the Birmingham figure of 60.4%. 19.3% were rented privately, 15.2% were rented from a housing association and 11.6% were rented from Birmingham City Council. There was a total number of 9,191 houses in Edgbaston, 525 of which were vacant. At 45.6%, the largest proportion of houses in Edgbaston were purpose-built blocks of flats. This is much higher than the city average of 17.9%. Detached houses were the second most common housing type in the ward at 19.7%.

Edgbaston had an unemployment rate of 8.1%, below the city average of 9.5% although above the national average of 5%. 13.4% of the population stated themselves as students. Of the unemployed, 42% were in long term unemployment and 15.6% had never worked. At 24.6%, the majority of the population worked in finance, real estate, and business activities. The largest employer in the area was the Heart of Birmingham Primary Care Trust, employing 10,000 people.

The Edgbaston Parliamentary Constituency has a much higher population.

Sport
Warwickshire County Cricket Club is based at the Edgbaston Cricket Ground, the area historically being part of Warwickshire. As well as hosting regular county matches, the ground plays host to the England cricket team during one day internationals and test matches.

The area also has a world class tennis venue; The Edgbaston Priory Club. The DFS Classic for female players has been held there every year since 1982 and some of the world's top players participate. The tournament is part of the WTA Tour and wins count towards world rankings. The oldest lawn tennis club in the world, the Edgbaston Archery and Lawn Tennis Society, founded in 1860 is nearby.

There is also a members-only golf course which offers views over the southern part of the suburb. Edgbaston Croquet Club has been located in the area since 1915.

Places of interest
The Church of England parish churches are St Augustine's Church, St Germain's Church, St. George's Church and St. Bartholomew's Church, also known as Edgbaston Old Church. Birmingham Central Synagogue built in 1961 is also in Edgbaston. The Roman Catholic church of the Birmingham Oratory, on Hagley Road, was built in 1907 in the Baroque style as a memorial to John Henry Newman, who founded the English Oratory here. Its dome is a prominent landmark.

The writer and academic J. R. R. Tolkien lived in Edgbaston during his teenage years, and the two towers of Edgbaston, Perrott's Folly and the Waterworks Tower, both close to the Oratory, are said to have provided inspiration for The Two Towers, part of his The Lord of the Rings trilogy. The Barber Institute of Fine Arts, which is located on the University of Birmingham campus, is a purpose-built gallery which contains a wide range of art from the Old Masters to Picasso.

Edgbaston Reservoir, formerly known as Rotton Park Reservoir, provides a header supply for the Birmingham Canal Navigations and is an important inner city leisure amenity. There are three public gardens located within Edgbaston; the Birmingham Botanical Gardens and the lesser known University of Birmingham Winterbourne Botanic Garden and Martineau Gardens. Adjoining the university gardens is Edgbaston Pool (not to be confused with the reservoir) which is a Site of Special Scientific Interest. Deer's Leap Wood is a Site of Local Importance for Nature Conservation in the former Mitchells & Butlers (brewery) land in the north part of Edgbaston. Edgbaston contains the only Grade I listed domestic building in Birmingham, notably one of the Arts & Crafts houses number 21 Yateley Road, designed by Herbert Tudor Buckland, and built for his own use. Edgbaston Hall, a Grade II listed country hall, is located within the ward. It is currently the clubhouse for Edgbaston Golf Club.

The BBC opened its Pebble Mill Studios at Pebble Mill in 1971, which were in use for 33 years until their closure in October 2004 and demolition the following year. The site is now the location of the new Birmingham Dental Hospital.

Politics
Birmingham Edgbaston is a constituency, and its Member of Parliament (MP) is Labour's Preet Gill.

The suburb is split into two wards (Edgbaston ward and Edgbaston North ward) on Birmingham City Council. There are two councillors in each. Edgbaston is represented by two Conservative councillors and North Edgbaston is represented by two Labour councillors. Of the other wards of the Edgbaston constituency, Bartley Green is represented by two Conservative councillors, Harborne by two Labour councillors, and Quinton by two Labour councillors.

The constituency has sent a female member to Parliament for the past 68 years. Previous MPs included Prime Minister Neville Chamberlain, who was born in Edgbaston.

Education

Since the beginning of the 20th century, Edgbaston has been home to Edgbaston High School for Girls, St Paul's School for Girls, St George's School, King Edward's School, King Edward VI Five Ways School, King Edward VI High School for Girls and Priory School. 

Two universities have campuses in Edgbaston, the University of Birmingham and Birmingham City University; there are numerous university halls of residence in the area. The Joseph Chamberlain Memorial Clock Tower, one of Birmingham's tallest buildings, can be found at the centre of the University of Birmingham.

In addition, the area is also home to a number of independent preparatory schools namely, West House School, Norfolk House School and Hallfield School, along with primary intakes at Edgbaston High School for Girls, Priory School and St Georges School.

Edgbaston is also the home of Queen's College, an ecumenical theological college. West House School, independent primary schools Birmingham Blue Coat School and Hallfield School [ St Swithun's School ] are also located in the area. The Elmhurst School for Dance, the oldest vocational dance school in the United Kingdom, relocated to a new building in Edgbaston in 2004. St Philip's Grammar School used to be located adjacent to the Oratory. However, it became a sixth form college in 1976 and then merged with South Birmingham College in 1995.

Transport and amenities
Two railway stations serve the area. The first, University station, is found in south Edgbaston, west of University of Birmingham. The second is Five Ways railway station in the north of the ward on the city's Middle Ring Road. Both stations are on the Cross-City Line. Between these two stations used to be another, Somerset Road station; however, this was closed and demolished in 1930.

The A38 Bristol Road runs through the ward and is one of the main traffic arteries of the city reaching out to the south-west of the city and beyond from the city centre and New Street. Buses frequently stop along this route. There are several other bus routes throughout. The Worcester & Birmingham Canal passes through the area, connecting the city centre with the River Severn at Worcester. This was constructed and opened in the 1790s and is now used mainly for leisure and recreational purposes as opposed to its original industrial usage.

The A456 Hagley Road runs through the north of Edgbaston and gives a relatively swift link with the city centre as well as further away places including Halesowen, Kidderminster and Hereford.

The nearest public libraries to the area are in Harborne, Selly Oak and Balsall Heath, whilst the University of Birmingham main library (which members of the public can join for a fee) is in the area. There are a number medical facilities in the area, with some of the most well known being the University Medical Centre and the Calthorpe Clinic. A large hospital, the Queen Elizabeth Hospital, is located within the area, with the former Selly Oak Hospital site nearby.

Edgbaston Village tram stop opened as the terminus of the West Midlands Metro in July 2022.

Notable residents
Here is a list of notable residents, many of whom have had blue plaques erected on their former houses by The Birmingham Civic Society:

 Annette Badland, actress.
 Sir Gilbert Barling, surgeon, lived at Blythe Court, Norfolk Road and moved to 6 Manor Road after the death of his wife.
 Rosslyn Bruce, priest and naturalist, lived at 4 Manor Road between 1912 and 1923.
 Kate Bunce a famous Pre-Raphaelite painter 1856–1927.
 Dame Julie Walters, actress, was born and raised in Edgbaston. 
 Sir Austen Chamberlain, Foreign Secretary and Nobel Peace Prize laureate, lived at 83 Harborne Road.
 Neville Chamberlain, British Prime Minister, was born in a house called Southborne, in Edgbaston, and later became the area's MP.
 Oscar Deutsch, founder of Odeon cinemas, lived at 8 Rotton Park Road.
 Charles Geach MP, founder of the Midland Bank, lived in Wheeleys Hill (now Wheeleys Road).
 William Haywood, architect, lived at 245 Bristol Road (house now demolished).
 Sir Rowland Hill, the postal reformer, lived at 146 Hagley Road (house now demolished).
 Sir John Jaffray, founder of the Birmingham Daily Post and Birmingham Mail, lived at 249 Bristol Road.
 Major Arthur Keen MC (1895–1918), World War I flying ace, lived in Edgbaston until his military service.
 Celia Levetus (1874–1936), illustrator.
 Sir Oliver Lodge, physicist, lived at Westbourne Road (house now demolished).
 Pink Floyd drummer Nick Mason was born in Edgbaston. 
 Constance Naden, poet and philosopher, lived most of her life at Pakenham House, Edgbaston.
 Mary Neal social worker, suffragette and collector of folk dances, was born in Edgbaston.
 Cardinal John Henry Newman lived at the Birmingham Oratory, Hagley Road.
 Eugene W. Oates, ornithologist.
 Catherine Osler, suffragette, lived at 'Fairfield' on the corner of Hagley Road & Norfolk Road.
 John Henry Poynting, physicist, lived at 11 St Augustine's Road.
 Bertha Ryland (1882-1977), militant suffragette.
 Joseph Henry Shorthouse, Victorian novelist, lived at 60 Wellington Road, Edgbaston.
 Field Marshal William Slim, 1st Viscount Slim lived in Poplar Avenue.
 Joseph Sturge, abolitionist, lived at Wheeleys Road (house now demolished).
 J. R. R. Tolkien lived here for a period during his younger life, living for a time in Stirling Road, with Perrott's Folly and the Edgbaston Waterworks supposedly providing him with the inspiration behind The Two Towers. 
 Dr William Withering, physician, lived at Edgbaston Hall.
 John Wyndham, the science fiction author, was brought up here and lived at 239 Hagley Road (now demolished) until 1911 when his parents divorced. 
 Francis Brett Young, novelist, lived at 105 Harborne Road.
 Herbert Tudor Buckland.  Arts and Crafts architect, lived at 21 Yateley Road; it is open to the public.

References

Further reading
Terry Slater, 2002, Edgbaston Past, Chichester: Phillimore.

External links
 Birmingham City Council: Edgbaston Constituency
 Birmingham City Council: Edgbaston Ward
 Calthorpe Estates
 Edgbaston Mill
 
 Profile: Edgbaston

 
Areas of Birmingham, West Midlands
Conservation areas in England